Neojanacus is a genus of small sea snails, limpet-like cap snails, marine gastropod molluscs in the family Hipponicidae, the hoofshells or hoof snails.

Species
Species within the genus Neojanacus include:
Neojanacus boucheti Riedel F., 2000
Neojanacus perplexus Suter, 1907
Neojanacus squamaeformis (Lamarck, 1802)†

References

Further reading 
 Powell A. W. B., New Zealand Mollusca, William Collins Publishers Ltd, Auckland, New Zealand 1979 

Hipponicidae